The second Shadow Cabinet of Bill English formed the official Opposition in the 52nd New Zealand Parliament from 2 November 2017 until 11 March 2018, during Bill English's second term as Leader of the Opposition.

The Shadow Cabinet was formed after the 2017 New Zealand general election, when a new Government was formed by the New Zealand Labour Party, New Zealand First party and Green Party of Aotearoa New Zealand. As the largest party not in government, the New Zealand National Party became the official opposition. National Party leader Bill English assigned spokesperson roles to his MPs in order to scrutinise the policies and actions of the government, as well to offer an alternative program. As many National MPs were Ministers in the previous National-led Government, many of them were named Spokespersons for areas in which they had previously had ministerial responsibility. Most other MPs picked up minor portfolios, although new MPs were not assigned any particular responsibilities.

In early 2018, English resigned from the leadership and was replaced as National Party leader by Simon Bridges on 27 February 2018. Other than Bridges' succession to the leadership, no changes to portfolio responsibilities were named until 11 March 2018, when Bridges announced his own Shadow Cabinet.

List of spokespersons
The Opposition portfolio spokespersons were as follows:

The ten MPs who entered Parliament at the 2017 general election (Simeon Brown, Andrew Falloon, Harete Hipango, Matt King, Denise Lee, Chris Penk, Erica Stanford, Tim van de Molen, Hamish Walker, and Lawrence Yule) were not ranked or given portfolio allocations.

References

New Zealand National Party
English, Bill
2017 establishments in New Zealand
2018 disestablishments in New Zealand
Cabinets established in 2017
Cabinets disestablished in 2018